This list of the tallest buildings in the Americas ranks skyscrapers in order by height. This list includes skyscrapers from North America and South America.

List

See also 
List of tallest buildings

List of tallest buildings in North America

List of tallest buildings in South America

References 

Skyscrapers_in_North_America
Skyscrapers_in_South_America